The District Bar Association Faisalabad is the third-largest bar association in Pakistan. It is based in Faisalabad city.

Notable members

See also
 Pakistan Bar Council
 Lahore High Court

References

Punjab Bar Council